KRRM (94.7 FM) is a radio station broadcasting a gold-based country music format. Licensed to Rogue River, Oregon, United States, the station serves the Medford-Ashland area. The station is owned by Carl Wilson and Sarah Williams, through licensee Grants Pass Broadcasting Corp.

On January 4, 2021, KRRM returned to the air with country music ranging from the 70s through today.

References

External links

Country radio stations in the United States
Rogue River, Oregon
Grants Pass, Oregon
RRM
1994 establishments in Oregon